Tim Burton (born 17 September 1987), known professionally as Shmee150 or Shmee, is a British car vlogger and YouTuber, who is based in London. His YouTube channel has over two million subscribers and features videos of him traveling to see exotic cars and maintaining and using his own car collection.

Biography 
Burton was born on 17 September 1987. He left school after he passed his A Levels around 2005. Before becoming a car vlogger, he owned an electronics web store, which he sold to become a ski instructor in New Zealand. When he returned to the UK after a fall, he initially started to study, but stopped a few weeks later. Subsequently, he got a job as part of the technology team at an investment consultancy firm in the City of London. He started posting pictures of special cars he spotted on his Facebook page and on online forums beginning in 2008 as a hobby. Burton uploaded his first video on YouTube on his Shmee150 channel in January 2010. It featured two supercars at a Top Gear event. He did not appear in the camera frame in his first videos, instead capturing special cars.

His online following started out small, but began to grow over the next years, causing him to leave his other job a few years after his first video. In 2016, a book written by Burton called Living the Supercar Dream was published by Blink Publishing about his trips and experiences. He also started to accumulate a car collection. His first car had been a Renault Clio, and his first sports car was an Aston Martin Vantage. His former cars include three McLarens, a Ferrari FF, a Porsche 911 GT3, a classic Mini, and a Morgan 3-Wheeler Currently, he owns about 15 cars, amongst them  a Zenvo TSR-S, Ford GT, a McLaren Senna, an Aston Martin Vantage GT8, a Mercedes-Benz SLS AMG Black Series, a Mercedes-Benz AMG GT Black Series and a McLaren 675LT Spider. He has also purchased a Morgan Super 3 a Ferrari Purosangue and a Ferrari 296 GTS, all awaiting delivery during 2023.

Burton has over two million subscribers on his YouTube channel, with an audience that is around 95% male and largely between 25 and 45. Part of his income is earned through advertisements during his videos and on his social media, but Burton also generates revenue through merchandise, sponsorships, and consultancy for car brands. He uploads several videos per week and vlogs about using and maintaining his car collection and about his road trips and travels. During his trips Burton visits press launches, special and rare cars, and other car collections.

References

External links 

 Shmee150's channel on YouTube
 Personal website

1987 births
YouTubers from London
Lifestyle YouTubers
Living people
British car collectors
English YouTubers